The 82nd Oregon Legislative Assembly is the current legislative session of the Oregon Legislative Assembly, which convened on January 9, 2023.

The Democratic Party of Oregon kept a majority in both chambers, but no longer hold a supermajority. As a result of the 2022 Oregon State Senate election, the Democrats lost one seat to keep a 17–13 majority, and in the 2020 Oregon House of Representatives election, the party lost two seats to now hold a 35–25 majority.

Legislation

Successful

Sent to referendum

Unsuccessful

Senate 
The Oregon State Senate is composed of 17 Democrats, 12 Republicans, and one Independent. Senator Art Robinson is registered as a Republican, but caucuses with Independent Brian Boquist.

Senate President: Rob Wagner (D-19 Lake Oswego)
President Pro Tempore: James Manning Jr. (D–7 Eugene)
Majority Leader: Kate Lieber (D-14 Beaverton)
Minority Leader: Tim Knopp (R-27 Bend)

Events

House
The Oregon House of Representatives is composed of 35 Democrats and 25 Republicans. Republicans gained one seat from the previous session.

Speaker:Dan Rayfield (D-16 Corvallis)
Speaker Pro Tempore: Paul Holvey (D-8 Eugene)
Majority Leader: Julie Fahey (D-14 Eugene)
Minority Leader: Vikki Breese-Iverson (R-59 Prineville)

See also
 2022 Oregon State Senate election
 2022 Oregon House of Representatives election

Notes

References

External links 
 Oregonlive.gov—Measures introduced into the Oregon Legislature IN THE 2022 SESSION
 Chronology of regular legislative sessions from the Oregon Blue Book
 Chronology of special legislative sessions from the Blue Book

2022 in Oregon
2023 in Oregon
Oregon
Oregon
Oregon legislative sessions
Oregon Legislative Assembly